The Spree Forest (German: Spreewald, ; Lower Sorbian: Błota, i.e. 'the Swamps') is a large inland delta of the river Spree, and a historical cultural landscape located in the region of (Lower) Lusatia, in the state of Brandenburg, Germany, about 100 km southeast of Berlin and close to the city of Cottbus (L.S. Chóśebuz). The Spree Forest is located within the settlement area of the (Lower) Sorbs, and the region is officially bilingual, German and Lower Sorbian.

As extensive floodplain and bog landscape, the Spree Forest was designated a biosphere reserve by UNESCO in 1991, called Biosphärenreservat Spreewald (biosferowy rezerwat Błota). It is known for its traditional irrigation system, consisting of more than 200 small canals (called Fließe;) within the  area, for its unique flora and fauna, and for its traditional flat-bottomed boats, the Spreewaldkähne. The landscape was shaped during the last Ice Age.

The region's most populous towns are Lübbenau/Spreewald (L.S. Lubnjow/Błota), which is known for the incorporated villages of Lehde (Lědy) and Leipe (Lipje), the villages with canals instead of streets, and Lübben (Spreewald) (Lubin (Błota)). Other notable towns are Vetschau/Spreewald (Wětošow/Błota) with its reconstructed Old Slavic fortified wooden settlement (gord) Slawenburg Raddusch (Radušańske słowjańske groźišćo), and Burg (Spreewald) (Bórkowy (Błota)).

Overview

About 50,000 people live in the biosphere reserve (1998). Many of them are descendants of the first settlers in the Spree Forest region, the Slavic tribes of the Sorbs and Wends. They have preserved their traditional language, customs and clothing to this day.

Most inhabitants depend on tourism. Many tourists explore the Spree Forest in punts. Agriculture, forestry and fishery are other important sources of income. The principal town of the area is Lübbenau.

The Spree Forest gave its name to the following German districts:
 Dahme-Spreewald
 Oberspreewald-Lausitz

Landscape and nature 
Alder forests on wetlands and pine forests on sandy dry areas are characteristic of the Spree Forest region. Grasslands and fields can be found as well. About 18,000 species of flora and fauna have been identified. In 1991, the Spree Forest was designated a UNESCO "Biosphärenreservat" (Man and Biosphere Reserve Programme).

Economy 
The Spree Forest is a tourist destination, and a centre of production of natural organic products. The tourism and economic demarcation of the Spree Forest is thus much more difficult than its geographical extension. Due to its popularity and the associated advantage, the borders of the Spree Forest tourism and business area have increasingly extended beyond the original bounds of the Spree Forest. This is particularly true of the regional food industry, as the Spree Forest economic area created for this industry is much larger than the real Spree Forest. This economic area is protected by the Protected Geographical Indication scheme of the EU. Before the legal protection of the space there were several court disputes over the designation Spree Forest on food labels.

Map

Gallery

See also 
Spreewald gherkins

External links 

 
 The Spreewald Guide - your Guide for the Spreewald area
 Information about country, people and tourism in the Spreewald in English
 Cycling-trip through the Spreewald – with many Pictures

References 

Biosphere reserves of Germany
Protected areas of Brandenburg
Dahme-Spreewald
Oberspreewald-Lausitz
Geography of Lusatia
North German Plain